The first series of the British television drama series Ackley Bridge began broadcasting on 7 June 2017 on Channel 4, and ended on 12 July 2017. The series follows the lives of the staff and pupils at the fictional multi-cultural academy school Ackley Bridge College, in the fictitious Yorkshire mill town of Ackley Bridge. It consists of six sixty-minute episodes.

Production
Channel 4 announced the casting for new school drama, The ABC, in early 2017. Production and filming on the series began in February 2017 in Halifax, West Yorkshire with the former St Catherine's Catholic High School used as Ackley Bridge College. The series was later renamed to Ackley Bridge.

Cast

Main

Recurring

Guest

Episodes

References

2017 British television seasons
Series 1